The 2011 FIFA Women's World Cup was an international football tournament that took place in Germany from 26 June until 17 July 2011. The 16 national teams involved in the tournament were required to register a squad of 21 players, including three goalkeepers. Only players in these squads were eligible to take part in the tournament.

Before announcing its final squad for the tournament, each participating national federation was required to submit a provisional squad. The final 21-player squad, three of whom must be goalkeepers, could only be drawn from the provisional squad, and had to be submitted to FIFA no later than 10 working days before the start of the tournament. Replacement of seriously injured players was permitted until 24 hours before the team in question's first World Cup game. Unlike the men's World Cup, in which replacement players do not have to be drawn from the provisional squad, the Women's World Cup requires that replacements be drawn from the provisional squad.

On 17 June 2011 the final squads were submitted and published.

Totals for caps and goals, club affiliations, and ages are as of the opening day of the tournament on 26 June 2011.

Group A

Canada
Head coach:  Carolina Morace

The squad was announced on 16 June.

France
Head coach: Bruno Bini

The squad was named on 6 June.

Germany
Head coach: Silvia Neid

A pre-squad of 26 players was announced on 18 March. After Dzsenifer Marozsán got injured in a training with the German national team, Conny Pohlers was called in to the squad. The line-up was officially reduced to 21 players on 27 May 2011.

Nigeria
Head coach: Ngozi Eucharia Uche

The final squad was announced on 14 June.

Group B

England
Head coach: Hope Powell

The squad was announced on 10 June 2011.

Japan
Head coach: Norio Sasaki

The squad was announced on 8 June 2011.

Mexico
Head coach: Leonardo Cuéllar

New Zealand
Head coach:  John Herdman

The squad was announced on 8 June 2011.

Group C

Colombia
Head coach: Ricardo Rozo

On 29 May 2011, Rozo announced a 25-player preliminary squad. The final squad was announced on 13 June. Goalkeeper Paula Forero was injured and replaced with Yineth Varón. On 25 June 2011, Yineth Varón tested positive to an unknown substance, and was provisionally suspended by the FIFA.

North Korea
Head coach: Kim Kwang-min

On 6 July 2011, Song Jong-sun and Jong Pok-sim were provisionally suspended prior to their team's match against Colombia after failing doping tests during the tournament. Following North Korea's elimination from the tournament, FIFA announced that three additional players (Hong Myong-hui, Ho Un-byol and Ri Un-hyang) also tested positive following target testing of the whole team.

Sweden
Head coach: Thomas Dennerby

On 30 May 2011, Dennerby announced the 21-player squad.

United States
Head coach:  Pia Sundhage

Coach Pia Sundhage announced her final 21-player squad on 9 May. US Soccer has provided a full squad listing on its official site. Lindsay Tarpley, named to the original squad, tore her right ACL in a friendly against Japan on 14 May, and missed the World Cup. Kelley O'Hara was named to replace Tarpley on 1 June.

Group D

Australia
Head coach:  Tom Sermanni

Brazil
Head coach: Kleiton Lima

The Brazilian Football Confederation (CBF) announced a preliminary squad of 25 players on 25 May, which was reduced to the final 21-player squad on 10 June.

Equatorial Guinea
Head coach:  Marcello Frigério

On 28 June 2011, Jade was suspended by the FIFA Disciplinary Committee due to eligibility issues, and was subsequently replaced by Emiliana Mangue.

Norway
Head coach: Eli Landsem

The Norwegian team was announced on 27 May 2011. 19 places were named with two spots left open. After Lise Klaveness and Lene Storløkken were unable to play at the World Cup due to injuries, Landsem announced her squad on 11 June. Lisa-Marie Woods was replaced by Kristine Wigdahl Hegland due to a hip injury.

Notes

References

External links
Official site

Squads
FIFA Women's World Cup squads